The Women's mass start competition at the 2019 World Single Distances Speed Skating Championships was held on 10 February 2019.

Results
The race was started at 16:21.

References

Women's mass start